Ricardo Jiménez (born February 26, 1983, in Mexico City) is a Mexican professional footballer who plays for Sonora of Ascenso MX on loan from UAT.

External links

Liga MX players
Living people
1983 births
Footballers from Mexico City
Mexican footballers
Association footballers not categorized by position
21st-century Mexican people